The  Torre KOI is a 64-story mixed-use skyscraper located in the Valle Oriente district of the Monterrey Metropolitan Area. Designed by VFO Arquitectos, it is the center piece of the VAO complex. Standing  it is currently the 2nd tallest complete building in Mexico.

Construction

To construct the foundation of the Torre Koi, it was necessary to conduct the largest casting of concrete for a building in Mexico at the time. This required the continuous pumping of concrete for 48 hours, starting on Saturday, December 21, 2013 at 8:00 am, concluding the following Monday morning. Twelve hundred concrete-carrying trucks were used for this work. Cemex, the supplier of concrete for the structure, devoted seven of its production plants exclusively to the casting for the foundation of the Torre Koi.

Description

Each apartment has access to its own storage space and 2 or 3 parking spaces. Furthermore, residents enjoy communal amenities on the 22nd floor, which include an infinity pool, a bar, a sauna, a private guest room, and more. The project was certified LEED BD+C Silver in May 2018.

References

Buildings and structures in Monterrey